Pherotesia is a genus of moths in the family Geometridae. The genus was described by Schaus in 1901.

Species
Pherotesia alterata Warren, 1905
Pherotesia bifurca Rindge, 1964
Pherotesia caeca Rindge, 1964
Pherotesia coiffaiti Herbulot, 1990
Pherotesia condensaria Guenée, [1858]
Pherotesia confusata Walker, 1862
Pherotesia cristata Herbulot, 1976
Pherotesia dystactos Rindge, 1990
Pherotesia falcis Rindge, 1964
Pherotesia flavicincta Warren, 1905
Pherotesia funebris Schaus, 1912
Pherotesia garka Rindge, 1990
Pherotesia gaviota Dognin, 1895
Pherotesia hamata Rindge, 1964
Pherotesia inhamata Rindge, 1990
Pherotesia liciata Dognin, 1911
Pherotesia lima Rindge, 1964
Pherotesia lunata Rindge, 1964
Pherotesia maculiplaga Dognin, 1916
Pherotesia malinaria Schaus, 1901
Pherotesia minuisca Rindge, 1964
Pherotesia obunca Rindge, 1990
Pherotesia pedaria Rindge, 1990
Pherotesia potens Warren, 1905
Pherotesia quadra Rindge, 1990
Pherotesia ralla Rindge, 1990
Pherotesia simulatrix Rindge, 1964
Pherotesia subjecta Warren, 1905
Pherotesia subsimilis Dognin, 1912
Pherotesia suffumosa Dognin, 1911
Pherotesia supplanaria Dyar, 1913
Pherotesia ultrasimilis Rindge, 1964

References

Boarmiini